The San Francisco Air Defense Sector (SFADS) is an inactive United States Air Force organization.  Its last assignment was with the 28th Air Division, being stationed at Beale Air Force Base, California.

The sector was established in February 1959 assuming control of former ADC Western Air Defense Force units in California west of the Sierra Nevada; north of Santa Barbara and south of Eureka. The organization controlled several aircraft and radar squadrons.

On 1 December 1960 the new Semi Automatic Ground Environment (SAGE) Direction Center (DC-18) became operational.   DC-18 was equipped with dual AN/FSQ-7 Computers.   The day-to-day operations of the command was to train and maintain tactical flying units flying jet interceptor aircraft (F-94 Starfire; F-102 Delta Dagger; F-106 Delta Dart); (2 F-101B Voodoo Squadrons) in a state of readiness with training missions and series of exercises with SAC and other units simulating interceptions of incoming enemy aircraft.

The 83d Fighter-Interceptor Squadron and 84th Fighter-Interceptor Squadron at Hamilton AFB, Ca., both were part of the sector's forces, under the command of the 78th Fighter Wing.

The Sector was inactivated on 1 August 1963 as part of an ADC consolidation and reorganization; and its units were assigned to 28th Air Division at Hamilton Air Force Base, California.

Lineage 

 Established as San Francisco Air Defense Sector on 15 February 1959
 Inactivated on 1 August 1963

Assignments 
 28th Air Division, 15 February 1959 – 1 August 1963

Stations 
 Beale AFB, California, 15 February 1959 – 1 August 1963

Components 
 78th Fighter Wing (Air Defense)
 Hamilton AFB, California, 1 July 1960-1 August 1963

Interceptor squadrons 

 82d Fighter-Interceptor Squadron
 Travis AFB, California, 1 July 1960-1 August 1963
 456th Fighter-Interceptor Squadron
 Castle AFB, California, 1 July 1960-1 August 1963

Radar squadrons 

 634th Radar Squadron
 Burns AFS, Oregon, 1 July 1960-1 September 1960 
 658th Aircraft Control and Warning Squadron
 Winnemucca AFS, Nevada, 1 July 1960-1 September 1961
 666th Radar Squadron
 Mill Valley AFS, California, 1 July 1960-1 August 1963
 668th Aircraft Control and Warning Squadron
 Mather AFB, California, 1 July 1960-1 September 1961
 682d Radar Squadron
 Almaden AFS, California, 1 July 1960-1 August 1963

 774th Radar Squadron
 Madera AFS, California, 1 July 1960-1 August 1963
 776th Radar Squadron
 Point Arena AFS, California, 1 July 1960-1 August 1963
 821st Radar Squadron
 Baker AFS, Oregon, 1 July-15 September 1960
 858th Radar Squadron
 Fallon AFS, Nevada, 1 July-15 September 1960
 866th Radar Squadron
 Tonopah AFS, Nevada, 1 July-15 September 1960

See also
 List of USAF Aerospace Defense Command General Surveillance Radar Stations
 Aerospace Defense Command Fighter Squadrons

References

  A Handbook of Aerospace Defense Organization 1946 - 1980,  by Lloyd H. Cornett and Mildred W. Johnson, Office of History, Aerospace Defense Center, Peterson Air Force Base, Colorado
 Winkler, David F. (1997), Searching the skies: the legacy of the United States Cold War defense radar program. Prepared for United States Air Force Headquarters Air Combat Command.
 Maurer, Maurer (1983). Air Force Combat Units Of World War II. Maxwell AFB, Alabama: Office of Air Force History. .
 Ravenstein, Charles A. (1984). Air Force Combat Wings Lineage and Honors Histories 1947–1977. Maxwell AFB, Alabama: Office of Air Force History. .
 Radomes.org San Francisco Air Defense Sector

Air Defense
1959 establishments in California
1966 disestablishments in California
Military units and formations disestablished in 1966
Military units and formations in California